Harcourt is a village located northeast of Clarenville. It was formerly named Sandy Point. It had a population of 120 in 1956. Harcourt is located in a non-tax district.

Populated coastal places in Canada